Adamor Pinho Gonçalves (born 11 March 1907, date of death unknown) was a Brazilian rower. He competed at the 1932 Summer Olympics and the 1936 Summer Olympics.

References

External links
 
 
 

1907 births
Year of death missing
Brazilian male rowers
Olympic rowers of Brazil
Rowers at the 1932 Summer Olympics
Rowers at the 1936 Summer Olympics
Place of birth missing